The Camden Sports Complex is a soccer football stadium located in Novar Gardens, an inner south-western suburb of Adelaide, South Australia. Camden Sports Complex is the home ground of Adelaide Galaxy and their juniors, West Torrens Birkalla.

The approximate capacity is 3,000 and it has sufficient lighting to host night matches. Camden Sports Complex also features car parking at the ground, undercover seating and standing area, a canteen and a bar and clubrooms.

It has one main pitch used for South Australian Super League matches and training (also junior training and matches) and one training pitch used for junior team training and matches.

Soccer venues in South Australia
Sports venues in Adelaide
Sports complexes in Australia